The 1987 Benson & Hedges Championships was a men's tennis tournament played on indoor carpet courts at the Wembley Arena in London in England that was part of the 1987 Nabisco Grand Prix. It was the 12th edition of the tournament and was held from 10 November until 15 November 1987. First-seeded Ivan Lendl won the singles title, his third at the event after 1984 and 1985.

Finals

Singles

 Ivan Lendl defeated  Anders Järryd 6–3, 6–2, 7–5
 It was Lendl's 7th singles title of the year and the 69th of his career.

Doubles

 Miloslav Mečíř /  Tomáš Šmíd defeated  Ken Flach /  Robert Seguso 7–5, 6–4

References

External links
 ITF tournament edition details

Benson and Hedges Championships
Wembley Championships
Benson and Hedges Championships
Benson and Hedges Championships
Benson and Hedges Championships
Tennis in London